Margaret Bamgbose (born October 19, 1993) is a Nigerian track and field sprinter who specialises in the 400 metres. She was an 11 All-Time American at University of Notre Dame.

Professional
Bamgbose ran the 400 meters at 2017 World Championships in 20th in a time of 52.23.

Bamgbose ran the lead-off leg in the 4 × 400 m relay for Nigeria at the 2016 World Indoor Championships. The team consisting of Bamgbose, Regina George, Tameka Jameson and Ada Benjamin missed out on a podium finish in 4th place. She placed third at the 2016 Nigeria Championships behind Patience George and Omolara Omotoso and thereby sealed her place for the Rio Olympic Games.

Notre Dame
In 2016, Bamgbose graduated from University of Notre Dame with a degree in Information Technology Management from the university's Mendoza College of Business. An 11-time All American, she set college bests in both the 200 m and 400 m in 2016. In 2014 and 2015, she finished in 6th place at the NCAA Outdoor finals on both occasions. She also made the finals in 2016 and finished in 4th place. She was also the 2015 ACC Indoor 400 Meter Champion.

NCAA Track and field championships

Personal and Prep
Bamgbose was born in the United States to Nigerian parents, Sunday and Afusatu Bamgbose who hail from Abeokuta in the southwest of Nigeria. She has two siblings, an older sister and a younger brother. She attended Evanston Township High School, Illinois. Bamgbose started off as a hurdler in her high school and early university days before excelling in the 400 metres flat event.

References

External links 
 
 All-Athletics profile
 

Living people
1993 births
Sportspeople from Evanston, Illinois
Track and field athletes from Illinois
American female sprinters
Nigerian female sprinters
Olympic athletes of Nigeria
Athletes (track and field) at the 2016 Summer Olympics
World Athletics Championships athletes for Nigeria
Notre Dame Fighting Irish women's track and field athletes
American people of Nigerian descent
Olympic female sprinters
21st-century Nigerian women